St Catherine's Chapel may refer to:

 St Catherine's Chapel, Abbotsbury, in Dorset, England
 St Catherine's Chapel, Artington, in Surrey, England
 St Catherine's Chapel, Lydiate, in Merseyside, England
 St Catherine's Chapel, Oxford, in Oxfordshire, England
 Royal Chapel of St Katherine-upon-the-Hoe, in Plymouth, England
 St. Katherine's Chapel, Williamston, Michigan
 St Catherine's Chapel, Mqabba, in Mqabba, Malta
Chapel of St. Catherine (Goa, India)

See also
St. Catherine (disambiguation)
St. Catherine's Church (disambiguation)